First Methodist Church Building is a historic church building at 105 W. 1st Street in Atoka, Oklahoma.

It was built in 1915 and added to the National Register in 1980.

References

Methodist churches in Oklahoma
Churches on the National Register of Historic Places in Oklahoma
Churches completed in 1915
Buildings and structures in Atoka County, Oklahoma
National Register of Historic Places in Atoka County, Oklahoma